Below are the results of the FIS Alpine World Ski Championships 2007 women's giant slalom which took place on 13 February 2007.

Results

References 

Women's Giant Slalom
2007 in Swedish women's sport